Desmond Morris (6 January 1961 – 7 January 1989) was a Jamaican athlete. He competed in the men's high jump at the 1980 Summer Olympics and the 1984 Summer Olympics.

References

External links
 

1961 births
1989 deaths
Athletes (track and field) at the 1980 Summer Olympics
Athletes (track and field) at the 1984 Summer Olympics
Jamaican male high jumpers
Olympic athletes of Jamaica
Place of birth missing